Amolops kaulbacki  (common names: Burmese sucker frog, Kaulback's torrent frog) is a species of frog in the family Ranidae that is found in northern Myanmar and Mizoram in northeastern India. It is named after Ronald Kaulback, a British botanist and explorer who collected the type series. Very little is known about this species.

References

kaulbacki
Amphibians described in 1940
Amphibians of Myanmar
Frogs of India
Taxa named by Malcolm Arthur Smith
Taxonomy articles created by Polbot